Star Warriors is a set of miniatures published by Ral Partha.

Contents
Star Warriors is a line of six 12-figure sets consisting of Power Armor, Marines, Mercenaries, Armed Civilians, Aliens, and an assortment pack.

Reception
Steve Jackson reviewed Star Warriors in The Space Gamer No. 44. Jackson commented that "If you're playing science fiction games in 15mm, these are excellent."

References

See also
List of lines of miniatures

Miniature figures